PT-305, also known as USS Sudden Jerk, was a 78 foot Higgins PT-200-class motor torpedo boat that served with Motor Torpedo Boat Squadron 22, assigned to the Mediterranean, based at Bastia, Corsica, and St. Tropez, France, where it participated in Allied invasions.

After World War II, the boat operated as a tour boat in New York City and as an oyster boat in the Chesapeake Bay. It was recovered and has been restored to its 1944 condition and is on display at The National WWII Museum in New Orleans.

Specifications 
source: The National WWII Museum

Higgins "78" PT boat specifications

References

Patrol vessels of the United States Navy
World War II patrol vessels of the United States
United States Navy in the 20th century
305
1943 ships
Museum ships in Louisiana